Cerberiopsis is a genus of plant in the family Apocynaceae, first described as a genus in 1873. The entire group is endemic to New Caledonia. The genus is related to Cerbera.

List of species
 Cerberiopsis candelabra Vieill. ex Pancher & Sebert
 Cerberiopsis neriifolia (S. Moore) Boiteau
 Cerberiopsis obtusifolia (Van Heurck & F. Muell.) Boiteau

References

 
Apocynaceae genera
Endemic flora of New Caledonia
Taxonomy articles created by Polbot